The GeSoLei was the largest trade fair in Germany during the Weimar Republic. It attracted 7.5 million visitors. The name was constructed from an abbreviation of abbreviations  of  the  German  words  for  public  health (Ge),  social  welfare (So),  physical exercise (Lei).

Surviving features of the event include the Tonhalle which at the time of its completion was the largest planetarium in the world, built by Wilhelm Kreis

References

Links
 Contemporary footage with German commentary
 Der Aufsteig (The Climb) a short film by Walter Ruttmann and Julius Pinschewer advertising the GeSoLei

Trade fairs in Germany
1926 establishments in Germany
History of Düsseldorf